Gisborne may refer to:

People
Gisborne (surname)

Places
Gisborne District, a unitary authority area in northeastern New Zealand named after William Gisborne
Gisborne, New Zealand, the largest centre of population in the Gisborne Region
Gisborne District Council, the unitary authority of the Gisborne Region
Gisborne (New Zealand electorate), a former New Zealand Parliamentary electorate
Gisborne, Victoria, Australia, a town named after Henry Fyshe Gisborne
Electoral district of Gisborne, an electoral district of the Victorian Legislative Assembly

See also
 Gisborne Herald, a newspaper published in Gisborne, New Zealand